The following is a timeline of the history of the city of Linz, Austria.

Prior to 19th century

 ca.400 CE - Roman fortress of Lentia 
 799 CE - First mention of the name Linz 
 823 CE - Archbishop of Passau in power.
 1190 - Babenberger Leopold V in power (approximate date).
 1210 -  (castle) expanded (approximate date).
 1236 - Siege by Bavarians.
 1251 - Ottokar II of Bohemia in power.
 1260 - Provincial administration based in the castle by Ottokar II of Bohemia.
 1324 - City rights granted.
 1391 - First mention of a prison at the castle.
 1489 - Meeting of Frederick III, Holy Roman Emperor and Matthias Corvinus, King of Hungary.
 1490 - Linz becomes capital of Österreich ob der Enns province.
 1497 - Bridge built.
 1564 -  construction begins.
 1619 - Castle seized by Protestant rebels.
 1620 - Bavaria in power.
 1626 - Peasants' War: castle besieged by the peasants.
 1628 - Austria in power.
 1659 -  expanded.
 1680 - Count Raimondo Montecuccoli a professional soldier, died in Linz.
 1682 - Church of Ignatius built.
 1725 -  (church) built.
 1741 - Linz taken by Bavarian forces during the War of the Austrian Succession.
 1742 - Linz recovered from the Bavarians.
 1785 - Roman Catholic Diocese of Linz established.
 1786 - Army barracks placed in the castle.
 1800 - Fire.

19th century
 1803 - Linz State Theatre built.
 1809 - 3 May: Battle of Ebelsberg fought near Linz during the War of the Fifth Coalition.
 1811 - Prison located in the castle.
 1833 - Museum Francisco-Carolinum founded.
 1836 -  (fortification) built.
 1851 - Prison relocated from the castle to Garsten. Army barracks placed in the castle.
 1858
 Linz Hauptbahnhof (main railway station) opened.
 Vienna-Linz railway begins operating.
 1864 -  development begins.
 1865 -  newspaper begins publication.
 1869 - Linzer Volksblatt (newspaper) begins publication.
 1873 -  and  become part of Linz.
 1877 -  built.
 1880 - Horsecar tram begins operating.
 1890 - Population: 47,560.

 1896 - Oberösterreichische Landesarchiv (regional archives) headquartered in Linz.(de)
 1898 - Pöstlingbergbahn (railway) begins operating.
 1899 - Flood.
 1900
  (bridge) opens.
 Population: 58,778.

20th century

 1910 - Population: 67,817.
 1915 -  becomes part of Linz.
 1919 -  and  become part of Linz.
 1920 - Population: 93,473.
 1923
  becomes part of Linz.
 Linzer Volksstimme newspaper begins publication.
 1924 - Cathedral of the Immaculate Conception consecrated.
 1926 -  (newspaper) begins publication.
 1933 -  (church) built.
 1934 - 12 February: Austrian Civil War begins at the Hotel Schiff in Linz, where the Social Democratic Party of Austria kept an office.
 1936 -  (tobacco factory) built.
 1937 - Linz designated a "Führer city" by Hitler.

 1938
 12 March: Hitler arrives in Linz during the annexation of Austria into Nazi Germany.
 Linz becomes seat of the Nazi Reichsgau Oberdonau (administrative division).
 Mauthausen-Gusen concentration camp begins operating near Linz.
  and  become part of Linz.
 Eisenwerke Oberdonau (steelworks) begins operating.
 1939 - Keferfeld becomes part of Linz.
 1940
  (bridge) built.
 Linz Städtischen Symphonieorchester (orchestra) formed.
 1943
 11 January: Linz I subcamp of the Mauthausen concentration camp established. Its prisoners were mostly from German-occupied Poland, Yugoslavia, Soviet Union and Germany.
 Bruckner Orchestra Linz active.
 1944
 Bombing by Allied forces during World War II.
 21 February: Linz II subcamp of Mauthausen established. Its prisoners were mostly from German-occupied Poland and Soviet Union.
  begins operating.
 26 May: Linz III subcamp of Mauthausen established. Its prisoners were mostly from German-occupied Soviet Union and Poland.
 3 August: Linz I subcamp dissolved, prisoners moved to the Linz III subcamp.
 1945
 Bombing by Allied forces.
 May: Prisoners of the Linz II subcamp are either moved to the Linz III subcamp or sent on a death march to the main Mauthausen camp. Subcamp dissolved.
 5 May: Allied forces take city. Linz III subcamp liberated by American troops.
 Oberösterreichische Nachrichten newspaper begins publication.
 1947 - University of Art and Design Linz established
 1952
 Linzer Stadion (stadium) opens.
  established.
 1962 -  church built.
 1965 - Memorial stone to former prisoners of the Linz I and Linz III subcamps of the Mauthausen concentration camp erected.
 1966 - Hochschule für Sozial- und Wirtschaftswissenschaften (school) established.

 1972 -  built.
 1974 - Brucknerhaus assembly hall opens.
 1975 - Johannes Kepler University Linz active.
 1979 - Ars Electronica festival begins.
 1985 -  (city hall) built.
 1986 - Donauhalle ice rink opens.
 1988 -  becomes mayor.
 1994 - Honorary Consulate of the Czech Republic opened.
 2000 - Linz AG established.

21st century
 2001 - Memorial at the former Linz II subcamp of the Mauthausen concentration camp erected.
 2003 - Lentos Art Museum opens.
 2004 - Linz Hauptbahnhof (train station) rebuilt.
 2010 - City co-hosts the 2010 European Men's Handball Championship.
 2013 -  becomes mayor.
 2014 - Honorary Consulate of Poland opened.
 2016
 City hosts the 2016 World Karate Championships.
 Population: 200,843.

See also
 Linz history (de)
 List of mayors of Linz
 , Roman-era fortress
  (city archives)
 Timelines of other cities in Austria: Graz, Salzburg, Vienna

References

This article incorporates information from the German Wikipedia.

Bibliography

in English
 
 
  + 1871 ed.

in German
 
  1812 ed.

External links

 Items related to Linz, various dates (via Europeana)
 Items related to Linz, various dates (via Digital Public Library of America)

Linz
Linz
linz
linz